The second season of Law & Order aired on NBC between September 17, 1991, and May 12, 1992. This season marked the first death of a main character, as George Dzundza had departed the series after the conclusion of the first season. The death of his character Max Greevey is shown in the season premiere. Carolyn McCormick makes her first recurring appearance as Dr. Elizabeth Olivet.

Cast
Phil Cerreta (played by Paul Sorvino) replaced season 1's Max Greevey (George Dzundza) in the role of senior detective.  The cast was otherwise unchanged.

Main cast
 Paul Sorvino as Senior Detective Sergeant Phil Cerreta
 Chris Noth as Junior Detective Mike Logan
 Dann Florek as Captain Donald Cragen
 Michael Moriarty as Executive Assistant District Attorney Ben Stone
 Richard Brooks as Assistant District Attorney Paul Robinette
 Steven Hill as District Attorney Adam Schiff

Recurring cast
 Carolyn McCormick as Dr. Elizabeth Olivet

Other notables
 Jerry Orbach made his initial appearance in the series in the episode "The Wages of Love", playing defense attorney Frank Lehrman; he would become a member of the principal cast beginning the next season after Paul Sorvino left, playing Senior Detective Sergeant Phil Cerreta’s replacement Senior Detective Lennie Briscoe, and remain with the show for twelve seasons.

Episodes

References

External links
 Episode guide from NBC.com

02
1991 American television seasons
1992 American television seasons